Olesya Nikolaevna Zykina (born October 7, 1980 in Kaluga) is a Russian athlete who mainly competes in the 400 metres. In addition to winning medals in individual contests, she has been a very successful relay runner, winning the silver medal at the 2004 Olympics.

International competitions

Personal bests
 100 metres - 11.84 s (1998)
 200 metres - 22.55 s (2005)
 400 metres - 50.15 s (2001)

References

 

1980 births
Living people
Sportspeople from Kaluga
Russian female sprinters
Olympic female sprinters
Olympic athletes of Russia
Olympic silver medalists for Russia
Olympic bronze medalists for Russia
Olympic silver medalists in athletics (track and field)
Olympic bronze medalists in athletics (track and field)
Athletes (track and field) at the 2000 Summer Olympics
Athletes (track and field) at the 2004 Summer Olympics
Medalists at the 2000 Summer Olympics
Medalists at the 2004 Summer Olympics
World Athletics Championships athletes for Russia
World Athletics Championships medalists
World Athletics Championships winners
World Athletics Indoor Championships winners
World Athletics Indoor Championships medalists
European Athletics Championships medalists
European Athletics Championships winners
Russian Athletics Championships winners